Bacnotan, officially the Municipality of Bacnotan, is a 1st class municipality in the province of La Union, Philippines. According to the 2020 census, it has a population of 44,388 people.

Economic activities in Bacnotan mostly involve farming, fishing, bee-keeping, pebble extraction, tourism, and Portland cement manufacture. Bacnotan is the seat of the beekeeping industry in La Union. A mining engineer from Bacnotan who saw the limestone deposits in Dumarang (renamed Quirino) also saw deposits of coal and traces of gas.

Surfing has become quite popular as well, surfers having discovered that there is a surfable break beside the Holcim Cement Factory. While there are no surfboard rentals yet, instructors from the nearby town of Urbiztondo have been known to bring their students to Bacnotan for lessons. The sand bottom causes an inconsistency in wave quality but is usually reliable for learning.

Schools in Bacnotan include the Don Mariano Marcos Memorial State University, the North Provincial High School (now Bacnotan National High School), the Bacnotan Elementary School, other elementary schools located in various barangays, and a prep school operated by the United Church of Christ in the Philippines in Bacnotan.

History
The town of Bacnotan was formally founded in 1599 as part of Ilocos Sur. In 1785, during the administration of the Governor-General Jose Basco, Bacnotan became a part of Pangasinan. When La Union was created in 1850, Bacnotan was one of the 12 towns that formed the province.

In the past, Bacnotan was only a vast expanse of wilderness inhabited by natives with a rudimentary form of government. There was a time when it was ruled by a despotic chieftain who had absolute control over all his constituents. Disobedience to his directives meant severe flogging of the culprit. After several years under the tyrannical rule of the chieftain, the people overthrew him and flogged their chieftain to death. The word "basnutan" means "flog" in the local dialect, and become a byword among the inhabitants, hence the name of the town. During the Spanish period, the name of the town was changed from "basnutan" to "Bacnotan" as shown by documents that are still kept intact at the National Archives in Manila.

The town's history is linked with the deeds of heroic men who fought, bled, and died for their own native land. At the turn of the century, during the Spanish–American War, Dumarang (now known as Quirino), was a scene of carnage and plunder.

During the first days of World War II, invading Japanese forces reached Bacnotan on December 21, 1941.

On January 4, 1945, the tides of war changed in La Union as Filipino and American soldiers captured the strategic Baroro Bridge in Bacnotan, which connects the rest of Northern Luzon to San Fernando. It was followed by the historic Battle of San Fernando and Bacsil Bridge. The victory ensured the liberation of La Union Province by joint Filipino and American troops at the end of World War II.

After the war, Bacnotan became the provisional seat of the provincial government, since San Fernando was then in ruins. As a consequence of this transfer, the La Union National High School was also moved to Bacnotan. When things went back to normal, the provincial government was again moved to San Fernando and the La Union National High School followed afterward. The transfer of the provincial high school in Bacnotan resulted in the establishment of the North Provincial High School (now Bacnotan National High School.)

In 1949, the vast mineral deposits of limestone used in portland cement production were noticed in Barrio Dumarang (now Quirino) by a mining engineer who was then a municipal councilor at that time. Because of the desire to create economic activity, the municipal council, through the efforts of this mining engineer, invited potential investors to set up a Portland cement plant. Within a year, a cement plant called Cebu Portland Cement (CEPOC), was established. On May 11, 1957, CEPOC, a government-owned corporation, was sold to the privately owned Bacnotan Consolidated Industries (BCI). BCI is the manufacturer of "Union Cement". In 2004, BCI was sold to Holcim Cement.

On June 18, 1960, the La Union Agricultural School was established. Nestling at the foot of the mountains of Barangay Sapilang, the agricultural school progressed and was later named Don Mariano Marcos Memorial State University. Its campus occupies an area of about 6 square kilometers.

Geography
Bacnotan is bounded on the north by Balaoan, on the east by San Gabriel, on the south by San Juan, and on the west by the South China Sea.

The western side of Bacnotan faces the South China Sea and has a long stretch of black sand beaches, indicating a large amount of magnetite. Some portions of the seashore have pebble and limestone deposits. The beaches, stretching about 16 kilometers, are suitable for fishing, boating, swimming, snorkeling, diving, and surfing.

Although San Juan is a favorite place among serious surfers, the waves in Quirino have been discovered to be likewise excellent for surfing.

The Baroro River, located at the southern boundary of Bacnotan, provides freshwater fishing, aquaculture farming, and recreation.

Climate
The climate in Bacnotan is dry from November to May and wet from mid-May to October. The south-west monsoon brings an abundant rainfall experienced during the wet season. The relatively dry season is caused by the north-east monsoon passing over the Cordillera Mountain Range.

Barangays
Bacnotan is politically subdivided into 47 barangays. These barangays are headed by elected officials: Barangay Captain, Barangay Council, whose members are called Barangay Councilors. All are elected every three years.

Demographics

Ilocano is the primary language spoken. English and Filipino are the languages used in government and business while English is the medium of instruction in schools.

Economy

Government
Bacnotan, belonging to the first congressional district of the province of La Union, is governed by a mayor designated as its local chief executive and by a municipal council as its legislative body in accordance with the Local Government Code. The mayor, vice mayor, and the councilors are elected directly by the people through an election which is being held every three years.

Elected officials

Notable personalities
Bacnotan has produced notable personalities in various endeavors. Some of them are as follows:
 Erlinda Fadera-Basilio — Ambassador and Permanent Representative of the Philippines to the United Nations and other International Organizations in Geneva, Switzerland; first woman Vice President of the UN Human Rights Council. Currently Philippine ambassador to China, Mongolia and North Korea.
 Fr. Bienvenido Nebres — longest-serving university president of Ateneo de Manila University

Gallery

References

External links

 [ Philippine Standard Geographic Code]
 Philippine Census Information
 Local Governance Performance Management System

Municipalities of La Union